Racquinghem is a commune in the Pas-de-Calais department in the Hauts-de-France region of France.

Geography
A large village some 6 miles (9 km) southeast of Saint-Omer, on the N43 road, located on the banks of the Noeufossé canal, the border between the department of Nord and the Pas de Calais.

The commune is close to the eastern boundary of the Helfaut plateau, a remarkable geological and ecological area, not typical of the region, which now hosts the Helfaut Nature Reserve. Its flora comprises both dry and wet heathland and some protected fauna, mostly amphibians.

History
The area has been populated since before Roman times, as testified by artefacts discovered in the commune. The name is probably derived from Rikiwulfinga-haim, referring to the occupation by the Viking Rikiwulf in 880, who also settled nearby Reclinghem.

Various wars have been waged around the town, including the war of 1046 to 1056 between Baldwin V, Count of Flanders (the Pious) and Henry III, Holy Roman Emperor, one battle of which was fought between Arques and Aire-sur-la-Lys. An artificial border was created on this occasion by digging a defensive canal called the Neufe-Fosse, which eventually became the Noeufossé canal.

Population

Places of interest
 The church of Notre-Dame, dating from the nineteenth century.
 The Château de Bambecq.

See also
Communes of the Pas-de-Calais department

References

Communes of Pas-de-Calais